My Name Is Joe is a 1998 British romantic drama film directed by Ken Loach. The film stars Peter Mullan as Joe Kavanagh, an unemployed recovering alcoholic in Glasgow, Scotland who meets and falls in love with a health visitor, played by Louise Goodall. David McKay plays his troubled friend Liam. The film's title is a reference to the ritualised greeting performed in Alcoholics Anonymous meetings, as portrayed in the film's opening scene.

The movie was mainly filmed in the council estates of Glasgow and filling small roles with local residents, many of whom had drug and criminal pasts.

The film won awards in many film festivals, including Best Actor for Mullan at the 1998 Cannes Film Festival. The British Film Institute ranked the film 91st in its 1999 BFI Top 100 British films list.

Plot
The film begins with Joe Kavanagh at an Alcoholics Anonymous meeting, relaying an experience from his past. Then, faking a police raid, Joe spooks his friends whom he coaches in a local football match. On the way to pick up Liam, a former junkie who Joe is fond of, they are cut off by a woman who is a health visitor serving Liam, his girlfriend Sabine, and their son Scott, assessing their culpability for welfare. Joe insists that Liam come to the game but Sarah, the health visitor, protests. Dropping off Liam after the match, Joe watches as Liam and Sabine have a confrontation outside their home with some thugs. He later spots Sarah outside the local health center, and flirts with her, offering to help her with her wallpaper. While working on Sarah's flat with his close friend Shanks, Joe spots a social worker taking photographs of him working, which violates his welfare policies. Joe grows enraged and threatens the social worker, attacking the car with his painting supplies. Later, while eating dinner, Joe reveals to Sarah that he is a recovering alcoholic.

Joe is called before social services to explain his alleged breaking of welfare policy, and the worker reveals that Sarah wrote in and insisted that the work was done as a personal favor, not for money. Joe visits the local health center to thank Sarah for intervening on his behalf and asks her on a date. Sarah is apprehensive about going on a date with Joe based on his strange behavior, but her receptionist friend Maggie says she is overthinking things. After the date, Sarah locks her keys out of the flat and Joe suggests that she stay with him, stressing that he is not trying to sleep with her. Joe shares stories of his past with Sarah, and she presses him about why he stopped drinking. Joe is hesitant at first, but explains that he stopped drinking because he brutally beat a previous romantic partner while he was heavily intoxicated, and that he is deeply ashamed of himself.

The next day at the local football match, the same thugs who hassled Liam at home arrive at the pitch and assault him, leading Joe to wonder if Liam has returned to drugs. Liam insists that the assault occurred as retaliation for a bar fight. At the health centre, Sabine causes a scene by refusing to put out her cigarette, and later captures Sarah's attention when she is found out for stealing a prescription pad. Her doctor insists that she be removed from the local register and sent to another clinic, but Sarah reminds the doctor that they have done much to help the family. At home, Liam confronts Sabine, who lied about where she has been, and accuses her of having sex with other men after finding condoms in her purse, as well as being on drugs. Later, Joe arrives, finding Sabine preparing to inject heroin. He reluctantly helps her inject, and she reveals that Liam has been abducted by the thugs, who work for local drug dealer and crook McGowan, whom Joe knows from his youth. McGowan reveals that Liam owes him money, and has repeatedly failed to pay it back. Liam tells Joe that he stopped dealing heroin when he went to prison, but that Sabine took over and owes 1,500 pounds to McGowan because she uses the drugs rather than sell them. Liam was not aware of the dealing until very recently, and tells Joe that McGowan's thugs have threatened to cripple him if he cannot pay the money back. Joe threatens McGowan over this, but McGowan proposes Joe traffick drugs for him as a way of solving Liam's debt. Joe and Liam return home, and he lies to Sarah that the matter has been sorted.

After an intimate night with Sarah, Joe goes to Kintyre to pick up a car that is implied to contain drugs. He has doubts while driving back to Glasgow, flashing back to a conversation with Shanks who deeply disapproves of what Joe is doing. In a later scene, Joe gives Sarah a pair of earrings, as well as a ring. Joe tells Sarah that he loves her. Sarah tells him that she does not want the ring and Joe cannot understand what he has done wrong, throwing the ring into the river in a fit of rage. Later, Sarah arrives at his door and apologizes. The next day, Joe unwittingly plays getaway driver for his football team, who rob a shipment of jerseys at a sporting goods store. Meanwhile, Sarah reveals to her co-worker Maggie that she is pregnant. Sarah meets with Sabine and Liam in a park, where Sabine inadvertently reveals Joe's lie, insisting that he paid McGowan off. Liam complicates things further by telling Sarah that Joe simply got them an extension on their payments, and Sarah accuses him of lying. She goes to Joe's flat and presses him for more information about his dealings with McGowan, expressing her concerns. Joe seems to have placated her, but Liam arrives abruptly and warns Joe about Sarah's questions. She grows enraged that Joe is complicit in dealing drugs, but he insists that he does not have the same resources as her, and had no other way to help Liam. Sarah leaves the apartment in tears after discovering her presents were bought with an advance from McGowan.

Joe goes to Liam's flat and gives him money to leave town, saying that he will not complete the second job for McGowan. After this, he goes to Sarah's and unsuccessfully tries to reconcile with her. At McGowan's snooker hall, he says he will not complete the job. McGowan brushes him off, and tries to get Joe thrown out. After one of McGowan's thugs makes lewd comments about Sarah, Joe flies into a rage and brutally beats all of McGowan's men. Knowing he has marked himself for death, he buys liquor and returns home. Later, Liam arrives and finds Joe in a drunken stupor. He tells Joe that McGowan's men are pursuing both of them, but Joe drunkenly insults Liam for not following his instructions and refuses to move. Backed into a corner, Liam ties a rope around his neck and jumps out of the window. Joe awakes and tries to pull him back up, but is too inebriated to lift Liam, who dies. Joe spots Sarah at Liam's burial, and the two walk off together.

Cast
Peter Mullan – Joe Kavanagh
Louise Goodall – Sarah Downie
David McKay – Liam
Anne-Marie Kennedy – Sabine (as Annemarie Kennedy)
David Hayman – McGowan
Gary Lewis – Shanks
Lorraine McIntosh – Maggie
Scott Hannah – Scott
David Peacock – Hooligan
Gordon McMurray – Scrag
James McHendry – Perfume
Paul Clark – Zulu
Stephen McCole – Mojo
Simon Macallum – Robbo

Reception
The film grossed £253,530 ($423,395) in the United Kingdom. It grossed $354,952 in the United States and Canada, for a worldwide total in excess of $778,347.

See also
 BFI Top 100 British films

References

External links
 
 
 

1998 films
1998 drama films
Artisan Entertainment films
Films scored by George Fenton
Films about alcoholism
Films directed by Ken Loach
Films set in Glasgow
Films set in Scotland
Scottish films
British drama films
English-language Scottish films
English-language French films
English-language German films
English-language Spanish films
1990s British films
Films shot in Glasgow